Elbert Raine Curtis (24 April 1901 – 20 May 1975) was the ninth general superintendent of the Young Men's Mutual Improvement Association of the Church of Jesus Christ of Latter-day Saints  (LDS Church) from 1948 to 1958. He was succeeded in the leadership of the YMMIA by Joseph T. Bentley.

Born in Salt Lake City, Utah, Curtis was also a president of the Western States Mission of the LDS Church and a president of the Sugar House Stake of the church.

Background
In 1971, Curtis was awarded the Silver Buffalo Award from the Boy Scouts of America for his efforts in integrating Scouting into the YMMIA of the LDS Church.

Curtis was married to Luceal Rockwood and was the father of three children. Curtis died in Salt Lake City.

See also
David S. King

References

1901 births
1975 deaths
20th-century Mormon missionaries
American Mormon missionaries in the United States
American leaders of the Church of Jesus Christ of Latter-day Saints
General Presidents of the Young Men (organization)
Latter Day Saints from Utah
Mission presidents (LDS Church)
People from Salt Lake City